In mathematics, the Caristi fixed-point theorem (also known as the Caristi–Kirk fixed-point theorem) generalizes the Banach fixed-point theorem for maps of a complete metric space into itself. Caristi's fixed-point theorem modifies the -variational principle of Ekeland (1974, 1979). The conclusion of Caristi's theorem is equivalent to metric completeness, as proved by Weston (1977). 
The original result is due to the mathematicians James Caristi and William Arthur Kirk.

Caristi fixed-point theorem can be applied to derive other classical fixed-point results, and also to prove the existence of bounded solutions of a functional equation.

Statement of the theorem

Let  be a complete metric space. Let  and  be a lower semicontinuous function from  into the non-negative real numbers. Suppose that, for all points  in 

Then  has a fixed point in  that is, a point  such that  The proof of this result utilizes Zorn's lemma to guarantee the existence of a minimal element which turns out to be a desired fixed point.

References

Fixed-point theorems
Metric geometry
Theorems in real analysis